Cara Castronuova (born February 6, 1980) is an American champion boxer, a professional sports announcer, political activist and celebrity fitness trainer. She has won two Golden Gloves championships in Madison Square Garden. She was ranked #2 nationally by USA Boxing. Castronuova also starred as one of the head celebrity trainers on Season 11 of NBC's The Biggest Loser and is a boxing ring announcer.

Early life

Castronuova was born and raised in Elmont, New York with three younger brothers. She began boxing at the age of five in the family garage with her father Nicholas Castronuova, who was a decorated United States Marines Corps Vietnam War veteran (Purple Heart, Bronze Star) of Italian American heritage. She also wrestled in high school and in college. She graduated from Hofstra University with a Bachelor of Arts degree in communications.

Her mother Rosita was a Chinese immigrant from the Philippines and worked as an architect.

Boxing career
Castronuova began her boxing career as a youth boxing trainer. Soon, she started entering local bouts, winning her first fight in 2002 at the NY Empire State Games in Syracuse. She also was a volunteer for a government-funded program designed to teach troubled youth the virtues of boxing and keep them off the streets.

Later, while working as a personal fitness and boxing trainer at popular sports clubs in the New York City area, like Chelsea Piers and Gleason's Boxing Gym, she used fighting and boxing to encourage clients to “find their warrior within.” While continuing to train clients, Castronuova kept boxing competitively, winning a pair of “Silver Gloves” in 2004, the second-place prize in the Golden Gloves competition.  Determined to redeem herself, Castronuova came back one year later and won her first New York Golden Gloves championship at Madison Square Garden in 2005 in front of a televised, capacity crowd.

Following her first Golden Gloves win, she started competing nationally and was ranked #2 in the nation by USA Boxing. She went on to place in National boxing tournaments and win numerous titles, such as the NYABC title, the Metros, and the Empire State Games, and won her second Golden Gloves title in 2006 at Madison Square Garden.  Certified as a boxing coach by the New York State Athletic Commission, she is also a personal trainer certified by ISSA (International Sports Science Association).

Personal life
Castronuova is of Chinese, Filipino, and Italian heritage. Her Italian ancestry can be traced back Castronuovo di Sant'Andrea where her last name originated.

Her mother is from Cotabato, Philippines and of mixed Chinese and Filipino heritage. Her ancestry is from the Fujian Province in Southern China.

Her father died from Vietnam War causes related to Agent Orange when Cara was a teenager and is buried in Arlington National Cemetery.

Her mother died in a car accident in 2006.  These unfortunate events fueled her ambition and motivated her to become a role model and a strong foundation for her family, especially for her three younger brothers and her elderly aunt who lives with her and is disabled. She has stated “I became the 'matriarch' as the oldest child and had to step up to the plate.” “Boxing competitively taught me how important it is to never give up, no matter how hard it gets”.

Castronuova has been tied romantically in the past to Showtime color commentator Paulie Malignaggi.

Television career and appearances
Cara has trained extensively in martial arts and other fighting techniques, which led to acting opportunities, primarily as a stuntwoman and stunt coordinator.  In addition, she has worked as a correspondent and fitness writer for news and boxing press outlets, and as a sports commentator in various boxing venues like Madison Square Garden and Mohegan Sun.

Castronuova has learned first hand that in boxing and in life, “a comeback is important,” and that fighting mentality has served her well, professionally and personally.  She was credited by NBC for inspiring Season 11 contestants and the audience of The Biggest Loser to find "their fighter within" and make their own comebacks on the road to good health.

She spent one season on NBC's hit show The Biggest Loser as a head trainer opposite Jillian Michaels, Bob Harper and Brett Hoebel.

She has been featured on Bravo's Top Chef Masters.

Castronuova has appeared in and voiced characters for Grand Theft Auto.

She has been featured on the cover of USA Today as well as on/in E!, Entertainment Tonight, TMZ, The History Channel, The New York Daily News, The New York Post, The National Enquirer, Self magazine, Shape magazine and Women's Health.

She has worked as a spokesperson for Puma and Everlast Sports.

Cara shot a pilot for a major production company and it is currently being shopped. She shot it with her ex-boyfriend, professional boxer and Showtime color commentator Paulie Malignaggi.

Cara founded the Knockout Obesity Foundation, a 501(c)(3) nonprofit organization that helps kids that are obese or at risk of becoming obese lose weight and get healthy by teaching them the virtues of boxing.

On October 14, 2013 Cara participated in an Everlast/Modell's sponsored event for breast cancer awareness in Times Square.

Castronuova is a boxing and referee apprentice for USA Boxing.

Castronuova is notable as one of the few female boxing ring announcers in the USA. On January 10, 2020 she announced the Press Conference Weigh-In and the undercard leading up to the historical Showtime Championship Boxing "Herstory" matchup between Claressa Shields and Ivana Habazin.

Political activism
In 2020, Castronuova has appeared on Fox & Friends and other news outlets speaking about her political movement "Liberate New York".

She was recognized by President Donald Trump for her work in political activism on his Twitter account before it was shut down.

She was one of the organizers of the Justice for J6 rally, a September 18, 2021 rally in Washington, D.C. in demonstration in support of those arrested for the January 6th riot at the US capital.

References

Living people
American exercise instructors
Participants in American reality television series
People from Elmont, New York
American women boxers
Boxers from New York (state)
1973 births
Super-bantamweight boxers
American sportspeople of Filipino descent
American sportspeople of Chinese descent
American people of Italian descent
Sportspeople from Nassau County, New York
21st-century American women
Storm King School alumni